Evan Zimmermann is an American businessman, investor and philanthropist. He was the president and CEO of Antiquorum, a Swiss auction house, established in 1974, that specializes in watches.

Career 
Zimmermann is known for developing and implementing brand growth strategies. In 2008, he purchased Antiquorum, an international auction house based in Switzerland, in a $30 million deal. 

Over the next 10 years, the company experienced growth in its auction sales from $37 million to $90 million. Zimmermann was instrumental in solidifying Antiquorum's position as the largest watch auction house in the world. 

Under his management, Antiquorum sold Mahatma Gandhi's pocket watch for just under $2.1 million, Steve McQueen's Rolex Submariner for $234,000 (more than 20 times its estimate), setting a new world record for its reference, and Albert Einstein's Longines wristwatch for $596,000 (over 2000 percent of its estimate).

In 2018, after an initial minority investment in the company's European operations, FIDES Business Partner, a private equity firm based in Zurich, Switzerland, bought Antiquorum from Zimmermann for $154 million.

Zimmermann has been recognized by Forbes as an important collector of vintage Rolex watches and as one of the major investors in fashion industry startups. He developed an interest in the fashion industry through his family brand Zimmermann, and has made investments in numerous companies, including Farfetch, Rent the Runway, and Glossier.

Philanthropy
In 2021, Zimmermann, through his foundation Zimmermann Family Charitable Trust, donated $3 million to University of California to back initiatives focused on the causes and consequences of the Holocaust and the study of human rights, protection of minority rights and reparations for historical wrongs and injustices.

References

External links
 

Living people
Swiss businesspeople
Year of birth missing (living people)
20th-century Swiss businesspeople
21st-century Swiss businesspeople
American businesspeople
American investors
American people of Swiss descent